Thomas Sammons (October 1, 1762 – November 20, 1838) was a United States representative from New York.

The son of Sampson Sammons and Rachel Schoomaker, Sammons was born in Ulster County.  He attended the rural schools, served as an officer in the Revolutionary War, and engaged in agricultural pursuits. He was a delegate to the New York State Constitutional Convention of 1801, and  served as lieutenant, captain, and major in the State militia.

Sammons was elected as a Democratic-Republican to the 8th and 9th United States Congresses, holding office from March 4, 1803, to March 3, 1807. He was elected as a Federalist to the 11th, and as a Democratic-Republican to the 12th United States Congress, holding office from March 4, 1809, to March 3, 1813.

Afterwards he resumed his agricultural pursuits and died on the Sammons homestead in Montgomery County (near Johnstown). Interment was on the homestead in the Simeon Sammons Cemetery.

See also
United States House of Representatives elections in New York, 1802
United States House of Representatives elections in New York, 1804
United States House of Representatives elections in New York, 1808
United States House of Representatives elections in New York, 1810

Sources

1762 births
1838 deaths
People from Ulster County, New York
New York (state) Federalists
Democratic-Republican Party members of the United States House of Representatives from New York (state)
Federalist Party members of the United States House of Representatives